Pike Township is one of four townships in Ohio County, Indiana, United States. As of the 2010 census, its population was 527 and it contained 229 housing units.

History
Pike Township was founded in 1845.

Geography

Unincorporated towns
 Bear Branch at 
(This list is based on USGS data and may include former settlements.)

Cemeteries
The township contains four cemeteries: Bear Creek Cemeteries, Cooper, Pate and Saint Peters.

School districts
 Rising Sun-Ohio County Community Schools

Political districts
 State House District 68
 State Senate District 43

References
 
 United States Census Bureau 2009 TIGER/Line Shapefiles
 IndianaMap

External links
 Indiana Township Association
 United Township Association of Indiana
 City-Data.com page for Pike Township

Townships in Ohio County, Indiana
Townships in Indiana